kawamura-ganjavian, also known as studio kg, is an architecture and design studio based in Madrid, Spain + Lausanne, Switzerland.

Story

It was established in 2000 in London by Key Portilla-Kawamura (Oviedo, 1979) and Ali Ganjavian (Teheran, 1979) and moved to Madrid in 2006. Currently, the practice is formed by 10 collaborators.

Kawamura and Ganjavian met while studying at the University of East London in the mid-1990s, and continued their postgraduate studies at the Architectural Association and the Royal College of Art in London. They have worked in Tokyo with Kazuyo Sejima, in Basel with Herzog & de Meuron, in TBV School of Habitat in New Delhi and Lee-Wimpenny in New York.

Profile

kawamura-ganjavian have developed projects in different parts of the world. Their work ranges from ephemeral experiments such as Locutorio Colón, through a range of building types like the Aravaca psychiatric clinic, all the way to large scale territorial studies. Several of their projects are spaces dedicated to exhibiting art, such as Iniciarte. They are also known for developing a line of design products which includes pieces of furniture and small accessories

Exposure

kawamura-ganjavian has participated in conferences, workshops and exhibitions in Europe, Asia and South America. Their work has been published in multiple international magazines and books of architecture and design. They have been directors of the European Design Labs master course at the Istituto Europeo di Design in Madrid and have taught at the Accademia di Architettura di Mendrisio in Switzerland. They have been guest jurors at the UEL London, The Bartlett School London, ETH Zürich and École Polytechnique Fédérale de Lausanne schools of architecture.

Studio Banana

In 2006 they founded in Madrid the multidisciplinary creative platform Studio Banana which currently hosts 40 young professionals working in different creative disciplines. In 2007 together with some members of Studio Banana they founded Studio Banana TV, an on-line audiovisual platform dedicated to the promotion of culture and creativity. As well, every two Thursdays there are a cultural event as a projection, a performance or an exhibition.

Projects

Spaces

 Process as Paradigm. Exhibition space. LABoral art centre. Gijón, Spain; 2010
 Madrid Abierto info point. Madrid, Spain; 2010
 Librairie la Fontaine. Fitting of a bookstore. Lausanne, Switzerland; 2009-2010.
 Iniciarte. Art institution stand. Madrid, Spain; 2009. Collaboration with Ramiro Losada.
 Studio Banana. Transformation of workshop into creative studio. Madrid, Spain; 2007.
 Locutorio Colon. Public art commission. Madrid, Spain; 2005-2006. Collaboration with Maki Portilla-Kawamura and Tadanori Yamaguchi.
 Limac. Exhibition space. León, Spain; 2005.
 Room under a Slagheap. Contemplative space in a valley. Turón, Spain; 2002-2004. Collaboration with Maki Portilla-Kawamura, Tadanori Yamaguchi and Pedro Escobio.
 Musik Didactique. Multimedia exhibition. Zurich, Switzerland; 2003.
 Arco Madrid. Spatial design of art fair. Madrid, Spain; 2001. Collaboration with Vicente Salvador.

Territories

 Asturegion Territorial Lab. Territorial study. Asturias, Spain; 2008.
 Retroactive Simulacrum. Urban proposal. Quito, Ecuador; 2003.
 Space search engine. Urban study. London, UK, 2002.

Products

 Read in Peace
 Caterpillar
 Caterpillar Trestles
 Stickingrings
 Stickingsticks
 Plug on
 Eat with your fingers
 Scenter
 Giraffe
 Flword
 Earshell
 Ostrich Pillow

Teaching
European Design Labs Master course directors, 2009. Istituto Europeo di Design, Madrid.
DIY Studio workshop tutors, 2009. Centro Cultural Parque de España, Rosario, Argentina.
Guest jurors at Atelier Marc Angelil, 2008. ETH Zurich Faculty of Architecture, Zurich.
Atelier Riuso, Martin Boesch tutor assistants, 2007-2008. Accademia di Architettura, Università della Svizzera Italiana, Mendrisio, Switzerland.
Cartographic Fantasies workshop, 2004. Universität Kassel, Germany.
Guest jurors at Dip 10 Charles Tashima, 2004. AA School of Architecture, London.

Publications
 Madrid: A Monocle City Survey. Taylor, S. 'practice: kawamura-ganjavian', Monocle, no.29, vol.03, London, December09-January10, p. 94 (en)
 Transcript of presentation at City and Art Forum. "Art and Design Practicds in Reference to City and Art - II", Mimar Sinan University, Istanmbul, 2009,  pp. 107–133 (en).
 The Independent Design Guide, Selection of prominent contemporary design published by Thames&Hudson and edited by the former architecture and design editor of Wallpaper magazine. 'Heat me' and 'Divide It', in Housley L. (ed.), 'The Independent Design Guide', Thames & Hudson, London, 2009, pp. 299 and 310.
 1000 interior details for the home, 'Kaleidolight' in, Rudge, I. and Rudge, G. (ed.), '1000 Interior Details for the Home', Laurence King, London, 2009, p. 300.

External links
 kawamura-ganjavian@Studio Banana
 kawamura-ganjavian
 kawamura-ganjavian participated on the first Pecha Kucha Night in Bilbao at the Guggenheim Museum
 Talk by Studio kg in Matadero Refresh Madrid
 Children + Space Experimental workshop, Madrid, Spain, 2007

Architecture firms of Spain
Architecture firms of Switzerland